Dennis Robertson (born 14 August 1956) is a Scottish politician, and formerly a Member of the Scottish Parliament (MSP) for Aberdeenshire West constituency 2011–2016. He is a member of the Scottish National Party. He is the first blind MSP to be elected to the Scottish Parliament.

Education and early career
Robertson was educated at the Royal Blind School in Edinburgh (1968–1974), then studyied social work at Langside College (1981–1983). He worked as a social worker in Greenock from 1979. In 1989 he joined the Guide Dogs for the Blind association based in Forfar, before joining North East Sensory Services in 2005.

Political career
He was elected to the Scottish Parliament in 2011, after defeating the Liberal Democrat incumbent, Mike Rumbles, by a majority of 4,112 votes. In 2013 he was involved wit ha consultation looking at legislating to crack down on the fraudulent use of blue disabled badges.

He stood again in 2016 but was unseated by Alexander Burnett.

He then stood for local government in 2017. He was elected to Aberdeenshire Council for the Stonehaven and lower Deeside ward.

Personal life
Robertson has been registered as blind since he was 11. Married to Anne, the couple had two daughters. Their daughter Caroline died in February 2011, from complications arising from anorexia, after Robertson had started election campaigning.

References

External links 
 

1956 births
Living people
Blind politicians
Scottish National Party MSPs
Members of the Scottish Parliament 2011–2016
Scottish social workers
Councillors in Aberdeenshire